The Dividing Line is a studio album by the American punk rock band Youth Brigade, released in 1986 under the moniker The Brigade. This would be the band's only release with bassist Bob Gnarly, who replaced Adam Stern in 1985.

The track "It's A Wonderful Life" was featured during a scene in the 1987 ABC made-for-television film Easy Prey, and had been considered lost media because it was not listed in the film's credits at any point. The song was later identified on the Internet Movie Database (IMDb).

Track listing
 "I Scream"
 "The Struggle Within"
 "War for Peace"
 "The Story (Part 1)"
 "It's a Wonderful Life"
 "The Dividing Line"
 "The Last Frontier"
 "All Alone"
 "The Hardest Part"

Personnel
 Shawn Stern − guitars, vocals
 Bob Gnarly − bass, vocals
 Mark Stern − drums, vocals

References

1986 albums
Youth Brigade (band) albums